Matthew Faleuka Tagelagi (born 9 January 1979), known as Matt Faleuka, is a Niuean rugby union footballer. He plays as a wing and as a fullback.

Career
Faleuka is one of the best players of the small island nation of Niue and is currently the capitan of Niue national rugby union team. 

He played for the New Zealand Universities team in 2002 before representing Niue at the 2002 Commonwealth Games in Manchester in both Rugby Sevens and athletics. From 2003 he played for Northland. before  moving to Overmach Rugby Parma in 2007

References

External links
ITS Rugby profile

1979 births
Living people
Rugby union wings
Rugby union fullbacks
Niuean rugby union players
Niuean expatriate rugby union players
Expatriate rugby union players in Italy
Niuean expatriate sportspeople in Italy